Blue Bus of North Lanarkshire, also known as Blue Bus of Shotts or Law of Shotts, is a bus operator primarily serving the area of Shotts, North Lanarkshire in West Scotland.

It is a mainly local bus operator, based at Allanton, but is also involved in private coach business. The company was formed from the remnants of the bankrupted HAD Coaches. Blue Bus operate a variety of services across central Scotland.  the company operates services on four routes between Lanarkshire and West Lothian. There routes restored links that had been lost since the privatisation of Scottish bus services.

Blue Bus operates a fleet of Plaxton Beaver 2s and Alexander Sprint bodied Mercedes-Benz 709Ds.

In 2010 the company said they had approached Strathclyde Partnership for Transport (SPT) asking for a route serving Torbothie, Shotts to be subsidised, but were told there was no funding available. The original service was to cease 6 May. Ultimately, however, Strathclyde Partnership for Transport agreed to subsidize the route and the route was replaced with new service 10 May 2010.

Public hearing
On the 26 Octoter 2010, the company was fined £3,500, when the Vosa bus compliance officers noted the early and late running on a number of occasions. A driver was also found to have taken a bus out of service and stopped at his house for lunch, he was sacked the same day. Blue Bus will be appealing the decision of the Traffic Commissioner.

See also
List of bus operators of the United Kingdom

References

External links
Blue Bus website
Map of operations and information of services
Flickr gallery

Bus operators in Scotland
Companies based in North Lanarkshire